Teri Moïse (March 25, 1970 in Los Angeles, California – May 7, 2013 in Madrid, Spain) was a Haitian-American French singer.

Her parents emigrated from Haiti to South Central, Los Angeles. After high school she studied economics at the University of California, Berkeley. In 1990 she went to France, where she studied literature at the Sorbonne and worked as an au pair. After returning to the United States, she began studying at the Musicians Institute in Los Angeles.

In 1992, Moïse again moved to Paris and pursued a career in music working as a choir singer, bass player and songwriter. She eventually met Etienne De Crécy and Stéphane "Alf" Briat, with whom she collaborated on her 1996 self-titled debut album, which sold 500,000 copies. The album and its two singles Les poèmes de Michelle and Je serai là were among the most influential French Soul releases of the 1990s.

Teri Moïse is the final winner of the Victoire de la musique in the category »Artiste interprète ou groupe francophone,« receiving the award in 1997.

She committed suicide in her hotel room in Madrid, Spain, on May 7, 2013.

Discography

Albums
 1996 : Teri Moïse – #13 in Belgium, #12 in France, #27 in Quebec
 1999 : Teri Moïse – #54 in France

Singles
 1996 : "Les Poèmes de Michelle" – #30 in Belgium, #11 in France, #3 in Quebec
 1996 : "Je serai là" – #4 in Belgium, #8 in France, #49 in Quebec
 1998 : "Fais semblant" – #28 in France
 1999 : "Star" – #89 in France

References

External links
 Teri Moise discography and peak positions, on Lescharts.com

1970 births
2013 suicides
American women singers
Musicians from Los Angeles
Haitian emigrants to the United States
20th-century Haitian women singers
French-language singers of the United States
University of California, Berkeley alumni
University of Paris alumni
American expatriates in France
Suicides in Spain
Musicians Institute alumni
American expatriates in Spain
21st-century American women